B. E. Devaraj was a translator who pioneered the Lambadi version of the New Testament.  He was Acting Commissary and Vicar General of the Archdeaconry of Nandyal from 1950 to 1951.

Devaraj also taught in the Andhra Christian Theological College, Rajahmundry {affiliated to the Senate of Serampore College (University) - a University within the meaning of Section 2 (f)  of the University Grants Commission Act, 1956 (as modified up to 20 December 1985)}.

Ravela Joseph who compiled a bibliography of original Christian writings in Telugu with the assistance of B. Suneel Bhanu under the aegis of the Board of Theological Education of the Senate of Serampore College included books by B. E. Devaraj entitled A Commentary on First Corinthians (మొదటి కొరింథీ పత్రిక వ్యాఖ్యానము), Good Friday (మoఛి శుక్రవారము), and Love's Servant (ప్రెమదాసు).

The Bible Society of India Andhra Pradesh Auxiliary released the New Testament in Lambadi on 25 October 1999 in the presence of G. Babu Rao, then Auxiliary Secretary, G. D. V. Prasad, Director - Translations of the Bible Society of India, Central Office, Bengaluru and B. K. Pramanik, its General Secretary.
Lazarus Lalsingh of Badao Banjara Phojer who put in efforts for bringing the New Testament in Lambadi recalled the earlier efforts of B. E. Devaraj in translating texts into Lambadi at the release in 1999.

Contribution
 Books in Telugu
 1949 - Religious Lessons
 1956 - Good Friday (మoఛి శుక్రవారము)
 1960 - Gospel of St. Mark in simplified Telugu
 1967 - Love's Servant (ప్రెమదాసు).
1969 - History of the Church in India,
 1973 - A Commentary on First Corinthians (మొదటి కొరింథీ పత్రిక వ్యాఖ్యానము)
 Books in Lambadi (Translations)
 1963 - Gospel According to St. Mark
 1966 - Gospel According to St. Luke
 Books in Lambadi (Translations with Special Titles)
 1974 - Way of Hope, The Gospel According to St. Mark
 1975 - Way of Peace, The Gospel according to St. Luke
 1976 - Way of Life, The Gospel According to St. John

History and Studies
Devaraj attended the local S.P.G. School in Nandyal and then graduated from the Noble College in Machilipatnam in 1920 where he took a B.A. He also studied for an M.A. at the Madras University in 1929, eventually became principal of a Training School in Nandyal.

During 1946–1947, Devaraj attended a special course at the United Theological College, Bengaluru and was ordained as an Anglican Priest in 1948.

Reminisce
Talathoti Punnaiah who studied a 3-year theology course leading to Bachelor of Theology at the Andhra Christian Theological College, both at Rajahmundry and at Hyderabad from 1970-1973 recalls his association with B. E. Devaraj:

References
Notes

Further reading
 
 
 

Telugu people
Christian clergy from Andhra Pradesh
Indian Christian theologians
Indian lecturers
Senate of Serampore College (University) alumni
20th-century Anglican theologians
Christian ethicists
Bible translators
Living people
20th-century Indian translators
Academic staff of the Senate of Serampore College (University)
Year of birth missing (living people)